Jessica King is an American dancer and fitness instructor, best known for her classes at the exercise equipment company Peloton.

Early life and family 
King was born in 1985 and grew up in Myrtle Beach. She was exposed to fitness from a young age. Her mother, Ximena Bernales, was a competitive bodybuilder and owned boutique fitness studios.

Career 
King began her professional career as a dancer. She toured as a dancer and teacher and was the lead in a Cirque Du Soleil production in Las Vegas. In 2008, she was a Top 10 finalist on So You Think You Can Dance. She was dancing in a show in New York City when the  producer suggested she interview with Peloton, a new fitness startup looking for coaches. She accepted an instructor position despite having never been on a spin bike before.

Personal life
King is in a relationship with Sophia Urista, to whom she got engaged in 2020. In May 2022, the couple announced they were expecting a child.

References 

1985 births
Living people
21st-century American dancers
Place of birth missing (living people)
Life coaches
Peloton instructors
American LGBT people